Wessbecher Glacier is a glacier about 7 nautical miles (13 km) long, draining southeast from Mount Inderbitzen and south from Mount Mullen between Peristera Peak, Lishness Peak and Stikal Peak on the main ridge of Sentinel Range on the west and Marze Peak in Petvar Heights on the east, in the Ellsworth Mountains, Antarctica.

The glacier was first mapped by United States Geological Survey (USGS) from surveys and U.S. Navy air photos, 1957–59. It was named by Advisory Committee on Antarctic Names (US-ACAN) for Howard O. Wessbecher, a member of the winter party at McMurdo Sound, 1956, who was representative (assisting in logistical preparations) for the establishing of the South Pole Station.

See also
 List of glaciers in the Antarctic
 Glaciology

Maps
 Vinson Massif.  Scale 1:250 000 topographic map.  Reston, Virginia: US Geological Survey, 1988.
 Antarctic Digital Database (ADD). Scale 1:250000 topographic map of Antarctica. Scientific Committee on Antarctic Research (SCAR). Since 1993, regularly updated.

References

Glaciers of Ellsworth Land